BSSC may refer to:
Bally Sports SoCal
Baltic States Swimming Championships
Bendigo Senior Secondary College
Boston Ski & Sports Club
Broadcasting Satellite System Corporation